Francis Raymond Webster is a retired an Australian politician who represented the South Australian House of Assembly seat of Norwood from 1979 to 1980 for the Liberal Party.

His win at the 1979 state election was overturned by the Court of Disputed Returns, which found that a Liberal Party advertisement in an Italian language newspaper, describing Webster as "your representative" ("il vostro deputato"), gave the false impression that Webster was the sitting member. Webster lost the subsequent by-election.

References

Members of the South Australian House of Assembly
Liberal Party of Australia members of the Parliament of South Australia
Year of birth missing (living people)
Living people